Pseudorhaphitoma confortinii is a small sea snail, a marine gastropod mollusk in the family Mangeliidae.

Description
The length of the shell attains 7.5 mm.

Distribution
This marine genus occurs off Madagascar.

References

 Bozzetti, L. (2007). Pseudoraphitoma confortinii (Gastropoda: Hypsogastropoda: Conidae) nuova specie dal Madagascar Meridionale. Malacologia Mostra Mondiale. 54: 18.

External links
 Muséum National d'Histoire Naturelle : photo of holotype

confortinii
Gastropods described in 2007